Digitus II or second digit can refer to:
 Index finger (digitus II manus)
 Second or long toe (digitus II pedis)